Åke Hallman (12 November 1912 – 21 June 1973) was a Swedish footballer. He competed in the men's tournament at the 1936 Summer Olympics.

References

External links
 

1912 births
1973 deaths
Swedish footballers
Sweden international footballers
Olympic footballers of Sweden
Footballers at the 1936 Summer Olympics
People from Borås
Association football forwards
Sportspeople from Västra Götaland County